Labinot Sheholli (Serbian: Лабинот Шехоли, Labinot Šeholi; born 9 July 1988) is an ethnic Albanian professional footballer from Kosovo who plays for Swiss side Biel-Bienne as a defensive midfielder. He holds Swiss citizenship having lived most of his life in Switzerland.

Club career
In summer 2015 he joined Breitenrain, but he rejoined FC Biel as player/assistant coach in 2016.

Personal life
After moving to Switzerland in the mid-1990s, Sheholli and his brother Kastriot have played alongside each other at Biel-Bienne.

References

External links

1988 births
Living people
Kosovo Albanians
Kosovan footballers
Association football midfielders
FC Biel-Bienne players
FC Zürich players
FC St. Gallen players
FC Aarau players
FC Köniz players
Breitenrain Bern players
Kosovan expatriate footballers
Kosovan expatriate sportspeople in Switzerland
Expatriate footballers in Switzerland